Tilly  may refer to:

Places

France
 Tilly, Eure, in the Eure département
 Tilly, Indre, in the Indre département
 Tilly, Yvelines, in the Yvelines département

Elsewhere
 Tilly, Belgium, a village in the municipality of Villers-la-Ville, Belgium
 Tillicoultry (Tilly in Scots), a village in Clackmannanshire, Scotland
 Tilly, Arkansas, an unincorporated community

People
 Tilly (name), including a list of people with the given name, nickname or surname
 Johann Tserclaes, Count of Tilly (1559–1632), field marshal in the Thirty Years' War often referred to as Tilly

Fictional characters
 Sylvia Tilly, in Star Trek: Discovery
 Tilly Evans, on the British soap opera Hollyoaks
 Tilly Green, a main character from the TV series Big City Greens
 Tilly Jackson, a Red Dead Redemption 2 character
 Tilly, a French-speaking puppet from the British children's TV series Tots TV
 Tilly, the main character in Raymond Briggs' book and TV film The Bear

Other uses
 Tilly (book), a novel by Frank E. Peretti
 Tilikum (orca), sometimes referred to as Tilly, orca at Sea World Orlando
 Tilly (vehicle), any of a number of British utility Second World War vehicles 
 Tillys, a United States-based retail clothing company
 "Tilly", a poem by James Joyce featured in Pomes Penyeach
 Tilly, a short form for the plant genus Tillandsia

See also
Places in France
 Tilly-Capelle, in the Pas-de-Calais département
 Tilly-la-Campagne, in the Calvados département 
 Tilly-sur-Meuse, in the Meuse département 
 Tilly-sur-Seulles, in the Calvados département
 Alberto Octavio Tserclaes de Tilly (1646–1715), Spanish general in the War of the Spanish Succession
 Jacques Louis François Delaistre de Tilly (1749–1822), French general in the Napoleonic Wars
 Tilley (disambiguation)
 Tillie (disambiguation)